Marshall Crosby (18 February 1882 – 1 January 1954) was a popular Australian actor and singer of film, theatre, radio and TV. He appeared in a number of shows for J. C. Williamson Ltd and was a leading radio actor, remembered for his role as "Josh Roberts" in the long running ABC radio serial Blue Hills.

Personal life
He was the father of actor and radio producer Don Crosby, who was an Order of Australia recipient.

Filmography

References

External links
Marshall Crosby at Australian Dictionary of Biography

Australian male actors
1882 births
1954 deaths